Quay is a 2015 British short documentary film composed, shot, edited, produced, and directed by Christopher Nolan about animators Stephen and Timothy Quay. The film premiered at the Film Forum theatre in New York City on 19 August 2015.

Cast
Stephen Quay as himself
Timothy Quay as himself

Production
Nolan had been an admirer of the Quay Brothers' work since coming across their films when they were originally screened on Channel 4 in the UK in the early 1990s. In addition to making a documentary about the inner workings of the brothers' studio, Nolan curated a theatrical tour called The Quay Brothers in 35mm, showcasing newly restored 35mm prints of the Quay's films In Absentia, The Comb and Street of Crocodiles.

Reception
The programme and Nolan's short received critical acclaim, with Indiewire writing in their review that the Brothers "will undoubtedly have hundreds, if not thousands more fans because of Nolan, and for that The Quay Brothers in 35mm will always be one of latter's most important contributions to cinema". Stephanie Zacharek of The Village Voice wrote, "Nolan gives us a glimpse into their world: His delightful and mischievous little film swoops in on the brothers as they work in their studio, which looks like a long-abandoned — and haunted — toymaker’s studio, a repository of trays and drawers full of rusty metal parts, pots of paints and potions, and tufts of antique doll hair."

References

External links

2015 films
2015 short documentary films
British short documentary films
Documentary films about film directors and producers
Films directed by Christopher Nolan
2010s English-language films
2010s British films